Exclusive correlation spectroscopy (ECOSY) is an NMR correlation experiment introduced by O. W. Sørensen, Christian Griesinger, Richard R. Ernst and coworkers for the accurate measurement of small J-couplings.

The idea behind the experiment is to measure an unresolved coupling with the help of a larger coupling which is resolved in a dimension orthogonal to the small coupling. Three active nuclei are needed (SXI spin system) and the pulse sequence must be able to transfer magnetization from I to S without changing the spin state of X, otherwise the ECOSY pattern will vanish.

References
 C. Griesinger and R. R. Ernst (1987). Frequency offset effects and their elimination in NMR rotating-frame cross-relaxation spectroscopy. J. Magn. Reson. 75, 261–271.
 C. Griesinger, O. W. Sørensen and R. R. Ernst (1985). Two-dimensional correlation of connected NMR transitions. J. Am. Chem. Soc. 107, 6394–6396.
 C. Griesinger, O. W. Sørensen and R. R. Ernst (1986). Correlation of connected transitions by two-dimensional NMR-spectroscopy. J. Chem. Phys. 85, 6837–6852.
 C. Griesinger, O. W. Sørensen and R. R. Ernst (1987). Practical aspects of the E.COSY technique. Measurement of scalar spin-spin coupling constants in peptides. J. Magn. Reson. 75, 474–492.

Nuclear magnetic resonance experiments